A list of the films produced in Mexico in 1945 (see 1945 in film):

1945

External links

1945
Films
Lists of 1945 films by country or language